Abante (lit. Move forward) is a daily Filipino tabloid publication in the Philippines. Its office is in Makati and it is owned by Prage Management Corporation, a start-up company owned by two veteran journalists who took over the management and operations of Abante and its sister tabloid, Abante Tonite from the Monica Publishing Corporation of the Macasaet family in October 2017. Aside from Abante, Abante Tonite and NewsKo, the newspaper also operates Abante: TNT (Tunay na Tabloidista), a real-time online news website and its sister websites Bilyonaryo, Politiko, Fastbreak and Abogado, Radyo Tabloidista online radio, Teletabloidista, and Celebrity Radar, an entertainment magazine.

During the State of Emergency in 2006, operatives from the Criminal Investigation and Detection Group tried to raid Abante's office but withdrew when they saw that there were television crew in the area.

In September 9, 2019, four armed men burned the Abante Tonite printing house in Parañaque City. It was the first violent attack on the newspaper since its inception in 1987. The incident was condemned by the National Union of Journalists of the Philippines.

In October 10, 2022, Abante launched is online morning newscast called Abante Teletabloid and public service show I-Abante Mo! both shown on the tabloid's social media accounts.

References

Newspapers published in Metro Manila
1988 establishments in the Philippines
Companies based in Manila
Daily newspapers published in the Philippines